Gatling Gun (also known as Damned Hot Day of Fire and Machine Gun Killers) is a 1968 Italian-Spanish Spaghetti Western film directed by Paolo Bianchini  and starring Robert Woods.

Plot
In the waning days of the Civil War, Richard Gatling, creator of the gatling gun, offers his invention to the Federal Government. But Gatling is kidnapped by two assassins - under the employ of Tarpas. They also steal his new invention and kill three Union government agents. Soon after, the Pinkerton Agency sends out Cpt. Chris Tanner (himself a former secret service agent) to find Gatling and recover the weapon.

Cast 

 Robert Woods  as Cpt. Chris Tanner
 John Ireland  as  Tarpas
 Ida Galli  as Belinda Boyd
 Claudie Lange  as  Martha Simpson
 George Rigaud  as  Rykert
  Roberto Camardiel  as Dr. Alan Curtis
 Gérard Herter  as  Mr. Bishop
  Furio Meniconi  as  Jeremiah Grant
  Tom Felleghy  as  Pinkerton
 Ennio Balbo  as  Richard Gatling
  Tiziano Cortini  as  Jonathan Wallace 
 Rada Rassimov  as Mrs. Treble

References

External links

Spanish Western (genre) films
Spaghetti Western films
1968 Western (genre) films
1968 films
Films directed by Paolo Bianchini
1960s Italian films